Mykola Pavlyuk (born 22 October 1995 in Chernivtsi, Ukraine) is a professional Ukrainian football defender.

Career
Pavlyuk is a product of the Bukovyna Chernivtsi and Metalurh Donetsk youth sportive team systems.

After dissolution of Metalurh Donetsk in 2015, he was signed by FC Stal Kamianske and made his debut for main-squad FC Stal in the game against FC Dynamo Kyiv on 20 August 2017 in the Ukrainian Premier League.

References

External links
Profile at FFU Official Site (Ukr)

1995 births
Living people
Ukrainian footballers
Ukrainian Premier League players
FC Stal Kamianske players
FC Helios Kharkiv players
FC Bukovyna Chernivtsi players
FC Podillya Khmelnytskyi players
FC Epitsentr Dunaivtsi players
Association football defenders
Ukrainian First League players
Sportspeople from Chernivtsi